Stenomorphus californicus is a species of ground beetle in the family Carabidae. It is found in North America.

Subspecies
These four subspecies belong to the species Stenomorphus californicus:
 Stenomorphus californicus californicus (Ménétriés, 1843)
 Stenomorphus californicus darlingtoni Ball & Shpeley&Currie, 1991
 Stenomorphus californicus manni Darlington, 1934
 Stenomorphus californicus rufipes LeConte, 1858

References

Further reading

External links

 

Harpalinae
Articles created by Qbugbot
Beetles described in 1843